The southern double-collared sunbird or lesser double-collared sunbird (Cinnyris chalybeus) is a small passerine bird which breeds in southern Africa. It is mainly resident, but partially migratory in the north-east of its range.

Habitat
This sunbird is common in gardens, fynbos, forests and coastal scrub. The southern double-collared sunbird breeds from April to December, depending on region. The closed oval nest is constructed from  grass, lichen and other plant material, bound together with spider webs. It has a side entrance which sometimes has a porch, and is lined with wool, plant down and feathers.

Identification

The southern double-collared sunbird is 12 cm long. The adult male has a glossy, metallic green head, throat, upper breast and back. It has a brilliant red band across the chest, separated from the green breast by a narrow metallic blue band. The rest of the underparts are whitish. When displaying, yellow feather tufts can be seen on the shoulders. As with other sunbirds the bill is long and decurved. The bill, legs and feet are black. The eye is dark brown. The male can be distinguished from the similar greater double-collared sunbird by its smaller size, narrower red chest band and shorter bill.

The female southern double-collared sunbird has brown upperparts and yellowish-grey underparts. The juvenile resembles the female. The female is greyer below than the female orange-breasted sunbird, and darker below than the female dusky sunbird.

Behaviour
The southern double-collared sunbird is usually seen singly or in small groups. Its flight is fast and direct on short wings. It lives mainly on nectar from flowers, but takes some fruit, and, especially when feeding young, insects and spiders. It can take nectar by hovering like a hummingbird, but usually perches to feed most of the time.
 
The call is a hard chee-chee, and the song is high pitched jumble of tinkling notes, rising and falling in pitch and tempo for 3–5 seconds or more.

Sources
Sinclair, Hockey and Tarboton, SASOL Birds of Southern Africa,

References

External links
 (Lesser =) Southern double-collared sunbird - Species text in The Atlas of Southern African Birds.
 SASOL e-guide

southern double-collared sunbird
Birds of Southern Africa
southern double-collared sunbird
southern double-collared sunbird